Guy House, located at 309 Pine Street, Natchitoches, Louisiana, is a one-and-a-half-story Greek Revival house built in c.1850 by Samuel Eldridge Guy.  It was listed on the National Register of Historic Places in 1988.

It is a "galleried cottage", i.e. a small house with a porch (gallery), with vernacular Greek Revival style as interpreted by local builders and carpenters in rural DeSoto Parish.

The front gallery has six Doric posts and end pilasters;  there never was a rear gallery.  It has chimneys at each of two gable end walls.  The house originally had a central hall plan with two rooms on each side.

In 2002 the house was bought and moved from its original location near Mansfield, Louisiana to its actual site at 309 Pine Street, where is now hosting a bed and breakfast.

References

External links
Samuel Guy House B&B website

Houses on the National Register of Historic Places in Louisiana
Houses completed in 1850
Houses in DeSoto Parish, Louisiana
National Register of Historic Places in DeSoto Parish, Louisiana